Dorcadion archalense is a species of beetle in the family Cerambycidae. It was described by Mikhail Leontievich Danilevsky in 1996.

References

archalense
Beetles described in 1996